Arrowhead Mountain is a mountain located on Ellesmere Island, Nunavut, Canada and is located east northeast of Mount Oxford. The mountain was named due to the four ridges that rise to a peak.

References

British Empire Range
One-thousanders of Nunavut